Jonathan Holland (born February 18, 1985) is a former American football wide receiver. He was signed by the Edmonton Eskimos of the Canadian Football League in 2011, but was released prior to the regular season. He was drafted by the Oakland Raiders in the seventh round of the 2007 NFL Draft. He played college football at Louisiana Tech.

Early years
Holland attended Mangham High School in Mangham, Louisiana, where he lettered in football and track. In track, he placed first at the Louisiana Class 1A State Track Meet on the 400 meter dash with a time of 50.41 seconds.

Professional career

Oakland Raiders
Holland was drafted by the Oakland Raiders in the seventh round (254th overall) of the 2007 NFL Draft. He was placed on injured reserve on July 24, 2007, ending his rookie season.

Holland was promoted to the active roster on December 4, 2008, after the team waived offensive lineman Dylan Gandy. Holland was waived/injured by the Raiders on August 9, 2010.

References

External links
 Oakland Raiders bio

1985 births
Living people
American football wide receivers
Edmonton Elks players
Louisiana Tech Bulldogs football players
Oakland Raiders players
People from Monroe, Louisiana
Players of American football from Louisiana